The Ambassador of Malaysia to the Kingdom of Morocco is the head of Malaysia's diplomatic mission to Morocco. The position has the rank and status of an Ambassador Extraordinary and Plenipotentiary and is based in the Embassy of Malaysia, Rabat.

List of heads of mission

Ambassadors to Morocco

See also
 Malaysia–Morocco relations

References 

 
Morocco
Malaysia